"Blue Day" was a song written by Mike Connaris and released as a single by the English singer Suggs, in collaboration with the players of football team Chelsea, in 1997.  It reached number 22 in the UK Singles Chart.

References

1997 singles
Suggs (singer) songs
Chelsea F.C. songs
Football songs and chants
1996 songs